Charles Frederick Rice (1909-1962) was an Australian rugby league footballer who played in the 1930s.

Playing career
Rice had a six-year first grade career at the St. George club in the 1930s. A big strapping lock forward, Rice was a crowd favourite during his era at the club. Charlie Rice finished his career at Grenfell, New South Wales in 1938.

War service
Charlie Rice enlisted in the Australian Army on 11 February 1942, and served as a Driver in the 126 General Transport Company and was discharged on 7 May 1946.

Death
Rice died on 1 April 1962.

References

1909 births
1962 deaths
St. George Dragons players
Australian rugby league players
Rugby league locks
Rugby league second-rows
Australian military personnel of World War II